House Slaves (Swedish: Hemslavinnor) is a 1923 Swedish silent comedy film directed by Ragnar Widestedt and starring Dagmar Ebbesen, Agda Helin and Karin Swanström. It was based on a 1920 Danish play which first appeared in Sweden in 1921. It was shot at studios in Kungsholmen in Stockholm with location shooting at Ränneslätt.

The plot revolves around Grethe young woman who heads to Stockholm to find work as a domestic servant. Ebbesen reprised the role of Kristina in the 1933 remake House Slaves as well as the 1942 film We House Slaves as well as over five hundred times on stage.

Cast
 Dagmar Ebbesen as 	Kristina Mikkelsen
 Agda Helin as 	Grethe
 Elvin Ottoson as 	Palle Rasmussen
 Karin Swanström as 	Mathilde Rasmussen
 Erik Hoffman as Josef
 Olav Riégo as 	Sophus Sörensen
 Lia Norée as Anna Sörensen
 Fritz Strandberg as Tobias Klementsen
 Josua Bengtson as Carpenter
 Tyra Dörum as 	Carpenter's Wife
 Elsa Ebbesen as Job seeking girl 
 Hartwig Fock as Vacuum cleaner salesman
 Karl Hellgren as Einar - Grethe's fiancé
 Torsten Lennartsson as Customer at employment office
 Emma Meissner as Fru Stjernholm
 August Tollquist as Anselm - Kristiana's brother

References

Bibliography
 Freiburg, Jeanne Ellen. Regulatory Bodies: Gendered Visions of the State in German and Swedish Cinema. University of Minnesota, 1994.
 Qvist, Per Olov & Von Bagh, Peter . Guide to the Cinema of Sweden and Finland. Greenwood Publishing Group, 2000.

External links

1923 films
1923 comedy films
Swedish comedy films
Swedish silent feature films
Films directed by Ragnar Widestedt
Swedish black-and-white films
Films set in Stockholm
Films shot in Stockholm
Swedish films based on plays
Silent comedy films
1920s Swedish films